Creaseria is a genus of shrimps belonging to the family Palaemonidae.

The species of this genus are found in Central America.

Species:
 Creaseria morleyi (Creaser, 1936)

References

Palaemonidae